Megachile silvestris is a species of bee in the family Megachilidae. It was described by Rayment in 1951.

References

Silvestris
Insects described in 1951